Okenia pulchella is a species of sea slug, a Dorid nudibranch, a marine gastropod mollusc in the family Goniodorididae.

Distribution
This species occurs in the North East Atlantic.

References

 Thompson, T. E.; Brown, G. H. (1984). Biology of Opisthobranch Molluscs vol. 2. Ray Society (Monograph 156), London. 229 pp.

External links
 Alder J. & Hancock A. (1854). Notice of some new species of British Nudibranchiata. Annals and Magazine of Natural History. ser. 2, 14: 102-105
 Alder, J. & A. Hancock. (1845). A monograph of the British Nudibranchiate Mollusca: with figures of all the species. Ray Society, London 1-54, pls.1-48

Goniodorididae
Gastropods described in 1845
Molluscs of the Atlantic Ocean
Molluscs of Europe